The Administration of Border Crossings, Population and Immigration (PIBA), also known as the Population and Immigration Authority, is an Israeli government agency established on July 23, 2008.

Responsibilities and Oversight
It is responsible for administering population registries (including identification cards and passports), the granting of citizenship, name change request of citizens, approval and supervision of entry and exit, inspection and licensing of firearms, and the treatment of foreigners staying in Israel, including Palestinian workers, illegal aliens, migrant workers and refugees.
 
The Head of the Administration, Yaacov Ganot, was appointed in 2007. At the time, Knesset members and human rights groups expressed concern. Ganot had served as prisons commissioner and prior to that as head of the Immigration authority, where his employees were known for engaging in violent altercations with migrant workers.

Controversies
In November 2013 two employees of the agency were arrested and charged with extorting female foreign workers. Police alleged that the employees may have demanded sexual favors in return for granting residence permit extensions.

In May 2014 Lod District Court Vice President Avraham Yaakov ordered a Swedish tourist of Eritrean origin be released from detention and that the Population, Immigration and Border Authority pay her damages of 25,000 shekels. The judge offered a scathing critique of PIBA and suggested that racism was at work in PIBA's detaining a black Swedish citizen. In the proceeding PIBA had offered to release the tourist if she agreed to leave a deposit of 30,000 NIS. The judge called this proposal "scandalous" and ordered her immediate release. The judge commented on the implications of PIBA poor decision-making: “Officials of the respondent acted arbitrarily and in an extremely unreasonable manner,” he said. “Israel cannot be perceived in the world as preventing the entry of European citizens based solely on their ethnicity.”

In September 2014, PIBA issued its new year updates, and included information on the most common new baby names in Israel. However, PIBA only included the top names for Jewish babies and failed to note that the actual top new baby name in Israel for the previous year was "Mohammed." A spokesperson for PIBA denied that the deletion of Muslim names was racist or discriminatory and that it had simply released the information that people wanted.

References

Law of Israel
Immigration to Israel